Truong Cong Tung (born 1986 in Daklak, Vietnam) is a visual artist who lives and works in Ho Chi Minh City, Vietnam.

Life and creation work
He graduated from Ho Chi Minh City Fine Arts University in 2010, specializing in lacquer painting. His works include experiments in shaping, such as the use of paint on different materials to achieve a variety of effects. In addition to The sky, the sea (San Art, Vietnam), he also exhibited works in other places such as Himiko Café or Ho Chi Minh City Fine Arts Association. In recent years, he has expanded his practice to materials such as video and installation. Tung finds inspiration from spiritual culture, oral history and micro history to include works referring to the change of society, ethnic, religious and political problems. 

He has participated in a number of exhibitions inside and outside the country including the Taipei Biennale 2016, Umeå, Sweden, SeMA Biennale Mediacity Seoul 2014, Haunted Thresholds (Göttingen, Germany), South by Southeast (Osage Art Foundation, Hong Kong), Collectibles House (Hanoi), Seoul Museum of Art (SeMA biennale) Korea, Koganecho Bazzar (Yokohama, Japan).

Solo exhibitions
Fictive Communities Asia, Koganego Bazaar, Yokohama, Japan, (2014)
Above the Sky. Under the Sea, San-Art, Ho Chi Minh City (2011)

Group exhibitions 
SeMA Biennale Mediacity, Seoul (2014); Unconditional Belief, San-Art, Ho Chi Minh City (2014)
The Glimmer That We See/ Vietnam, FreeS Art Space, Taipei (2014)
The Festival of Independents, Charlie Dutton Gallery, London (2013)
Destruo, Nha San Collective, Hanoi (2013) and South Country, South of Country, Zerostation, Vietnam & Outsiders

References

External links
  official website

 Vietnamese contemporary artists
Living people
1986 births